Jewish English may refer to:
 Jewish English varieties, varieties of the English language
 British Jews, the British people of Jewish descent